The Lovin' Spoonful is an American rock band popular during the mid- to late-1960s. Founded in New York City in 1965 by lead singer/songwriter John Sebastian and guitarist Zal Yanovsky, the band is widely known for a number of hits, including "Summer in the City", "Do You Believe In Magic", "Did You Ever Have to Make Up Your Mind?", and "Daydream".

The Lovin' Spoonful was inducted into the Rock and Roll Hall of Fame in 2000, and in 2006 the group was inducted into the Vocal Group Hall of Fame.

Career

Formation and early years (1964–1965)
The band had its roots in the folk music scene based in the Greenwich Village section of lower Manhattan during the early 1960s. John B. Sebastian, the son of classical harmonicist John Sebastian, grew up in the Village in contact with music and musicians, including some of those involved with the American folk music revival of the 1950s through the early 1960s. Sebastian formed the Spoonful with guitarist Zal Yanovsky from a bohemian folk group playing local coffee houses and small clubs called The Mugwumps, two other members of which, Cass Elliot and Denny Doherty, later formed half of the Mamas & the Papas. The formation of the Lovin' Spoonful during this period was later described in the lyrics of the Mamas & the Papas' name dropping 1967 top ten hit, "Creeque Alley".

Drummer Jan Carl and bassist Steve Boone rounded out the group, but Carl was replaced by drummer-vocalist Joe Butler after the group's first gig at The Night Owl in Greenwich Village. Butler had previously played with Boone in a group called The Kingsmen (not the hit group of "Louie Louie" fame). The group's first Night Owl performances were reportedly so bad that the club owner told them to go away and practice, so they practiced in the basement of the nearby Hotel Albert until they had improved enough to draw audience attention.

The group made its first recordings for Elektra Records in early 1965 and agreed in principle to sign a long-term deal with Elektra in exchange for a $10,000 advance. However, Kama Sutra Records had an option to sign the Lovin' Spoonful as recording artists as part of a previously signed production deal, and Kama Sutra exercised the option upon learning of Elektra's intent to sign the band. The four tracks recorded for Elektra were released on the 1966 various artists' compilation LP What's Shakin' after the band's success on Kama Sutra.

Pop success (1965–1966)

The band worked with producer Erik Jacobsen to release their first single on July 20, 1965, "Do You Believe in Magic", written by Sebastian. Additionally, they wrote their own material (aside from a few covers, mostly on their first album), including "Younger Girl" (which missed the Hot 100), which was a hit for The Critters in mid-1966.

"Do You Believe in Magic" reached #9 on the Hot 100, and the band followed it up with a series of hit singles and albums throughout 1965 and 1966, all produced by Jacobsen.  The Lovin' Spoonful became known for such folk-flavored pop hits as "You Didn't Have to Be So Nice", which reached #10, and "Daydream", which went to #2.  Other hits included "Did You Ever Have to Make Up Your Mind?" (another #2 hit) and "Summer in the City", their only song to reach #1 on the Hot 100 (August 13–27, 1966).  Later that year, the #10 hit "Rain on the Roof" and the #8 hit "Nashville Cats" (which went on to become a staple in the concerts of bluegrass legend Del McCoury) completed the group's first seven consecutive Hot 100 hits to reach that chart's top 10.  The only other 1960s act to achieve that feat is Gary Lewis & the Playboys.

The Lovin' Spoonful was one of the most successful pop/rock groups to have jug band and folk roots, and nearly half the songs on their first album were modernized versions of blues standards. Their popularity revived interest in the form, and many subsequent jug bands cite them as an inspiration. The rest of their albums featured mostly original songs, but their jug band roots showed up again and again, particularly in "Daydream" and the lesser-known "Money" (which reached only #48, in 1968), featuring a typewriter as percussion.

Lovin' Spoonful members termed their approach "good-time music". In the liner notes of "Do You Believe in Magic," Zal Yanovsky said that he "became a convert to Reddy Kilowatt because it's loud, and people dance to it, and it's loud."  Soon-to-be members of the psychedelic rock band the Grateful Dead were part of the West Coast acoustic folk music scene when the Lovin' Spoonful came to town on tour. They credited the Lovin' Spoonful concert as a fateful experience, after which they decided to leave the folk scene and "go electric". 

At the peak of the band's success, the producers of the television series that later became The Monkees initially planned to build their series around the Lovin' Spoonful but dropped the band from the project due to conflicts over song publishing rights. The band also gained an added bit of publicity when Butler replaced Jim Rado in the role of Claude for a sold-out four-month run with the Broadway production of the rock musical Hair. The Lovin' Spoonful's song "Pow!" was used as the opening theme of Woody Allen's first feature film, What's Up, Tiger Lily; the band also composed and played instrumental music for the film and appeared in some live performance sequences in the film (reportedly added during post-production without Allen's knowledge or consent). Shortly thereafter, John Sebastian composed the music for Francis Ford Coppola's second film, You're a Big Boy Now, and the Lovin' Spoonful played the music for the soundtrack, which included yet another hit, "Darling Be Home Soon". Both films were released in 1966. In addition, the Michelangelo Antonioni film Blow-up, also released that year, contained an instrumental version of the Spoonful song, "Butchie's Tune", performed by jazz musician Herbie Hancock.

Personnel changes (1967)
In early 1967, the band broke with their producer, Erik Jacobsen, turning to Joe Wissert to produce the single "Six O'Clock", which reached #18 in the U.S.

Yanovsky left the band after the soundtrack album You're a Big Boy Now was released in May 1967, primarily due to a drug bust in San Francisco, in which he was arrested for possession of marijuana and pressured by police to name his supplier. He was a Canadian citizen and feared that he would be barred from re-entering the U.S., so he complied. The incident resulted in a public backlash from the counterculture against the band, with a full-page ad in the Los Angeles Free Press (according to music critic Ralph Gleason) "urging people not to buy Spoonful records and not to attend their concerts and, to the girls, not to ball them." Although Yanovsky went on to release a solo single and album, his musical career was severely harmed. He later left the music business and opened a restaurant, Chez Piggy, in Kingston, Ontario, Canada. The restaurant is now owned and run by his daughter.

Yanovsky, Sebastian and Boone all independently concurred in interviews that Yanovsky's sacking was due to Yanovsky's open disenchantment with the band's direction and Sebastian's songwriting. Sebastian's music was becoming "more personal" while Yanovsky desired a (probably unachievable) return to their early years club scene.

Yanovsky's replacement was Jerry Yester, formerly of the Modern Folk Quartet. Around this time, perhaps coincidentally, the band's sound became more pop-oriented.

The new line-up of the Lovin' Spoonful recorded two moderately successful Wissert-produced singles ("She Is Still a Mystery" and "Money"), as well as the 11-cut Everything Playing, issued in December 1967. Sebastian, whose final show may have been May 10, 1968, at Susquehanna University in Selinsgrove, Pennsylvania, left the group by the end of the month to go solo.<ref>"Rock and Roll Group Appears at Susquehanna". The Daily Item. Sunbury, Pennsylvania. May 8, 1968. Retrieved November 20, 2020, from Newspapers.com</ref>

Final years (1968–1969)
The group was now officially a trio, and drummer Butler (who had previously sung lead on a few album tracks) became the group's new lead vocalist. Up to this point Sebastian had written (or co-written) and sung every one of the Lovin' Spoonful's hits; the band now turned to outside writers for their singles, and used a variety of outside producers. The band's last two Hot 100 entries, "Never Goin' Back (to Nashville)" written by John Stewart and "Me About You", were sung by Butler. In addition, "Never Goin' Back" only featured Yester and Butler's playing—the other musical parts were played by session musicians, which had not occurred since drummer Gary Chester played on Do You Believe In Magic. "Never Goin' Back" was the highest-charting single of the group's post-Sebastian career, topping out at #73.

With commercial success waning, the Lovin' Spoonful lasted only until early 1969. They split up following the release of their album Revelation: Revolution '69. In 1969 Boone produced an album for Mercury Records by a group known as The Oxpetals, a cosmic rock band inspired by The Moody Blues' "In Search of the Lost Chord". When the album failed to chart Boone bought a sailboat and lived aboard for the next 4 years in the Caribbean. In 1973 he moved back to Baltimore, Maryland, took over a recording studio built by engineer George Massenburg, and renamed it Blue Seas after a ship that was salvaged in the Caribbean. Blue Seas went on to record many well known artists, among them Lowell George and Little Feat, who recorded "Feats Don't Fail Me Now" there, Robert Palmer and The Seldom Scene.

In 1970, following John Sebastian's 1969 solo performance at Woodstock, Kama Sutra issued the song "Younger Generation" as a single. Sebastian had closed his Woodstock set with the song. The single version was taken from the two-year-old Everything Playing album and credited to "The Lovin' Spoonful featuring John Sebastian"; it failed to chart.

In 1976, however, a solo Sebastian scored another No. 1 Hot 100 hit with "Welcome Back", the theme song to the ABC sitcom, Welcome Back, Kotter.  On this recording, Murray Weinstock (a current member of the Lovin' Spoonful) is playing piano.

Reunions, revivals, and Rock and Roll Hall of Fame induction (1979–present)
The original group (Sebastian, Yanovsky, Butler and Boone) reunited briefly in the fall of 1979 for a show at the Concord Hotel in the Catskills for an appearance in the Paul Simon film One Trick Pony, which was released in October 1980.

In 1991, after a long-awaited settlement with their record company, Butler and Boone decided to start up the Lovin' Spoonful again with Jerry Yester. They were joined by Jerry's brother, Jim Yester (vocals and guitar), formerly of The Association. Sebastian and Yanovsky declined to participate. In March 1992 drummer John Marrella was added to the band to allow Joe Butler to concentrate on vocals. After a two-month rehearsal in the Berkshire Mountains, the group started touring, with Joe Butler now the most common lead singer. Keyboardist David Jayco was added in June 1992. Jim Yester left this new grouping in March 1993 and was replaced by guitarist Randy Chance. Jerry's daughter, Lena Yester (vocals and keyboards), replaced David Jayco at the same time. Randy Chance was sacked in June 1993 and was not replaced. Mike Arturi replaced John Marrella on drums in March 1997 and Phil Smith joined on guitar in 2000 replacing Lena Yester.

The original four members of the Lovin' Spoonful were inducted into the Rock and Roll Hall of Fame on March 6, 2000. All four original members appeared at the ceremony and performed "Do You Believe in Magic" and "Did You Ever Have to Make Up Your Mind?".

Yanovsky died in 2002. Sebastian has stated that he no longer wishes to perform with the remaining members of the group because he wanted to move on when he left the group.

In 2006, the group was inducted into the Vocal Group Hall of Fame.

Jerry Yester was fired from the group in 2017 after being arrested on 30 counts of child pornography.

The current group, still led by Butler and Boone, continues to perform with Phil Smith (guitar & vocals), Mike Arturi (drums) and Murray Weinstock (piano & vocals).

In February 2020, the three surviving original members (Sebastian, Boone and Butler) performed together as The Lovin’ Spoonful for the first time in 20 years as part of the Wild Honey Orchestra’s all-star tribute to the band. The concert benefited the Autism Think Tank.

Legacy
John Lennon's personal jukebox was found to contain the Lovin' Spoonful record "Daydream." Interviewed about the find, John Sebastian revealed he had been given a Beatles rehearsal tape that contained Lennon singing "Daydream."

Paul McCartney has stated that "Good Day Sunshine" was "really very much a nod to The Lovin’ Spoonful's ‘Daydream,’ the same traditional, almost trad-jazz feel. That was our favourite record of theirs. ‘Good Day Sunshine’ was me trying to write something similar to ‘Daydream.’"

Dave Davies of the Kinks has stated he and brother Ray Davies listened to the Lovin' Spoonful "above and beyond the Beatles". He cited the band "integrating lots of different elements – blues, country and folk music and a bit of rock."

Members
Current members
 Joe Butler (1965–1969, 1979, 1991–present)
 Steve Boone (1965–1969, 1979, 1991–present)
 Mike Arturi (1996–present)
 Phil Smith (2000–present)
 Murray Weinstock (2019–present)
Past members
 John Sebastian (1965–1968, 1979, 2000, 2020)
 Zal Yanovsky (1965–1967, 1979, 2000; died 2002)
 John Marrella (1993–1997)
 Jim Yester (1991–1994)
 Lena Yester (1993–2000)
 David Jayko (1992–1993)
 Randy Chance (1994)
 Jerry Yester (1967–1969, 1991–2017)
 Jan Carl (1965)

Membership timeline

Name
The band's name was inspired by some lines in a song of Mississippi John Hurt called the "Coffee Blues". John Sebastian and others in the jug-folk scene of the time such as Geoff Muldaur credit Fritz Richmond for suggesting the name.

The song "Coffee Blues" is a tribute to Maxwell House Coffee, which Hurt describes, "rapping" in the beginning of the song, as being two or three times any other brand, ergo, he only needs one spoonful to make him feel all right, what he describes as "my lovin' spoonful" in the song. The song is part of a group of songs with a long history in recorded blues that generally use the term "a spoonful" to suggest sex, and in some cases use of a drug such as cocaine. The term "lovin' spoonful" has been conjectured as referring to the amount of ejaculate released by a human male during a typical orgasm.Marsh, Dave, and James Bernard. The New Book of Rock Lists. Fireside, 1994, p. 262. .Luft, Eric v.d. Die at the Right Time! A Subjective Cultural History of the American Sixties. Gegensatz Press, 2009, p. 124. .Burnham, Terry, and Jay Phelan. Mean Genes: From Sex to Money to Food, Taming Our Primal Instincts. Perseus, 2000, p. 152. .

DiscographyDo You Believe in Magic (1965)Daydream (1966)Hums of the Lovin' Spoonful (1966)Everything Playing (1967)Revelation: Revolution '69 (1968)

In popular culture

In the AMC television series Mad Men, which is set in the 1960s, the characters Sally Draper and Glen Bishop are fans of the band. The band's song "Butchie's Tune" is featured in the penultimate episode of the series' fifth season. Jazz saxophonist Bud Shank released an album of jazz covers of Lovin' Spoonful songs, A Spoonful of Jazz, in 1967. In 2016, rock artist Richard Barone recorded a version of the Spoonful's "Did You Ever Have To Make Up Your Mind?" featuring John Sebastian on harmonica and autoharp, and making a vocal cameo appearance. Bobby Weinstein and The Lovin' Cohens turned "Nashville Cats" into "Noshville Katz", a frequent Dr. Demento staple.

 Trivia 

Haruki Murakami mentions them in What I Talk About When I Talk About Running as an "old favorite", stating: "Today I ran for an hour and ten minutes, listening on my Walkman to two albums by the Lovin’ Spoonful -- 'Daydream' and 'Hums of the Lovin’ Spoonful'...I love listening to the Lovin’ Spoonful. Their music is sort of laid-back and never pretentious."

References

 The Fingerpicking Blues of Mississippi John Hurt: A Spoonful of Classic Songs taught by John Sebastian and Happy Traum'' DVD. Homespun Videos. July 2004. ASIN B0002KWSJ4

External links

The Lovin' Spoonful official site
The Lovin' Spoonful at Legacy Recordings

Classic Bands web site interview with John Sebastian. Accessed January 13, 2009.
The Magic's In The Music: A Lovin' Spoonful Fansite

 
American folk rock groups
American pop rock music groups
Kama Sutra Records artists
Musical groups from New York City
Musical quartets
Musical groups established in 1965
Musical groups disestablished in 1969
Musical groups reestablished in 1979
Musical groups disestablished in 1980
Musical groups reestablished in 1991
Psychedelic pop music groups
Psychedelic rock music groups from New York (state)